Judge Nielsen may refer to:

Howard C. Nielson Jr. (born 1968), judge of the United States District Court for the District of Utah
Leland Chris Nielsen (1919–1999), judge of the United States District Court for the Southern District of California
William Fremming Nielsen (born 1934), judge of the United States District Court for the Eastern District of Washington